Aliens Ate My Buick is the third studio album by English new wave/synth-pop musician Thomas Dolby, released in 1988.

Reception 
The album peaked at number 30 on the UK Albums Chart. The lead single from the album, "Airhead", peaked at number 53. Second and third singles, "Hot Sauce" and "My Brain Is Like a Sieve", peaked at number 80 and number 89, respectively. In the US, the album peaked at number 70.

Dolby has said in interviews that he believes the album's commercial failure was due to his change in musical direction, evident on the album.

Track listing 
All songs by Thomas Dolby, unless otherwise indicated.

 "The Key to Her Ferrari" – 4:39
 "Airhead" (Dolby, Grant Morris) – 5:07
 "Hot Sauce" (George Clinton) – 5:03
 "Pulp Culture" – 5:35
 "My Brain Is Like a Sieve" – 4:52
 "The Ability to Swing" (Dolby, Matthew Seligman) – 4:30
 "Budapest by Blimp" – 8:40
 "May the Cube Be With You" – 6:49 (CD/cassette bonus track)

Personnel 

 Thomas Dolby – vocals, keyboards

The Lost Toy People
 Larry Treadwell – guitar
 Mike Kapitan – synthesizer
 Terry Jackson – bass
 David Owens – drums
 Laura Creamer – vocals, percussion

Additional musicians
 Robin Leach – voiceover (track 1)
 Ed Asner – voiceover (track 5)
 Edie Lehmann – backing vocals (track 1)
 Donny Geraldo – backing vocals (track 1)
 Mendy Lee – backing vocals (track 1)
 Bruce Woolley – backing vocals (track 2)
 Colin Crabtree – backing vocals (track 2)
 Rose Banks Stone – backing vocals (track 3–5)
 Jean Johnson McRath – backing vocals (tracks 3–5)
 Lesley Fairbairn – backing vocals (track 7)
 Bill Watrous – trombone
 Arno Lucas – congas, timbales
 Bill Bottrell – spaghetti western guitar (track 3)
 Csilla Kecskesi – Hungarian aria (track 7)
 Erica Kiss – Hungarian translation (track 7)
 Gueysel Tejada – domestic cleaning and outburst (track 3)

Technical
 Thomas Dolby – co-producer, arrangements
 Bill Bottrell – co-producer, engineer
 The Lost Toy People – arrangements
 Steve Vance – artwork, typography
 Leslie Burke – front cover and inner sleeve photography
 Dennis Keeley – back cover photography
 Kathleen Beller – front cover model
 Mike Tacci – second engineer
 Daryl Koutnik – second engineer

References 

Thomas Dolby albums
1988 albums
Albums produced by Thomas Dolby
Albums produced by Bill Bottrell